Vernon Bruce Dent (February 16, 1895 – November 5, 1963) was an American comic actor, who appeared in over 400 films. He co-starred in many short films for Columbia Pictures, frequently as the foil and the main antagonist and ally to The Three Stooges.

Early career

In the early 1920s, Dent was a fixture at the Mack Sennett studio, working with comedians Billy Bevan, Andy Clyde, and especially Harry Langdon. Dent alternately played breezy pals and blustery authority figures opposite Langdon's timid character.

Sennett voided all contracts when it came time to retool his studio for sound, and Dent moved to Educational Pictures in 1929. Dent's supporting performances were frequently funnier than the sometimes uninspired antics of the nominal stars. When Educational hired Harry Langdon for a series of two-reelers in 1932, Vernon Dent resumed his place as Langdon's co-star.

Columbia Pictures
Dent joined Columbia Pictures' short-subject department in 1935, and achieved his greatest success there. He went on to work with practically every star on the payroll, including  Andy Clyde, Charley Chase, and Eddie Quillan (all fellow Mack Sennett alumni), as well as Buster Keaton, El Brendel, Barbara Jo Allen (Vera Vague), Hugh Herbert, Gus Schilling and Richard Lane, Harry von Zell and Bert Wheeler. Dent appeared very occasionally in feature films, including Million Dollar Legs, Chip Off the Old Block, Kill the Umpire, The Harvey Girls and Rockin' in the Rockies, but was much more visible in two-reel comedies.

Dent was most often featured in the Three Stooges films; in fact, he made more appearances in their films than any other supporting actor (96). Dent also appeared with The Three Stooges on a live CBS Television broadcast of The Frank Sinatra Show on January 1, 1952. Through his association with the Stooges, Dent became a close friend of Shemp Howard.

Diabetes and death
Dent suffered from diabetes later in life, and eventually went blind, retiring from performing. Films produced after this used previously filmed footage from his earlier shorts; as such, his last "appearance" was Guns a Poppin (1957). Dent had appeared in over 400 films by the time he retired.

Dent attended Shemp Howard's funeral in 1955. By that time, he was completely blind and had to be led to Shemp's casket. Character actor Emil Sitka was one of many at the event who did not know Dent had lost his sight:

Dent's diabetes worsened after his retirement, limiting his activities. He died of a heart attack on November 5, 1963. He is buried at Forest Lawn Memorial Park, in Hillside plot, grave L-3796.

Selected filmography

 Hail the Woman (1921) - Joe Hurd
 The Shriek of Araby (1923) - Minor Role (uncredited)
 Soul of the Beast (1923) - The Boob
 The Extra Girl (1923) - Aaron Applejohn
 Feet of Mud (1924) as the Coach
 Flirty Four-Flushers (1926, Short) - Bill Brown
 His First Flame (1927) - Amos McCarthy
 The Girl from Everywhere (1927) - Minor Role (uncredited)
 Golf Widows (1928) - Ernest Ward
 The Cameraman (1928) - Man in Tight Bathing Suit (uncredited)
 Midnight Daddies (1930)  - Baron von Twiddlebaum - Designer
Crazy House (1930 film)
 Murder at Midnight (1931) - Detective Eating Peanuts (uncredited)
 Dragnet Patrol (1931) - Cookie
 Dream House (1932, Short) - Director Von Schnauble
 Texas Cyclone (1932) - Hefty - the Bartender
 Business and Pleasure (1932) - Charles Turner (uncredited)
 Passport to Paradise (1932)
 The Riding Tornado (1932) - Hefty - Bartender
 Daring Danger (1932) - Bartender Pee Wee
 Million Dollar Legs (1932) - Secretary of Agriculture (uncredited)
 Please (1933, Short) - Elmer Smoot
 Just an Echo (1934, Short)
 You're Telling Me! (1934) - Fat Man in Compartment (uncredited)
 Manhattan Melodrama (1934) - Otto - German Dancer on Steamship (uncredited)
 Good Morning, Eve! (1934, early Technicolor short) - Emperor Nero
 The Painted Veil (1934) - Chief of Police (scenes deleted)
 Half Shot Shooters (1936, Short) - Man in Restaurant
 San Francisco (1936) - Fat Man (uncredited)
 Slippery Silks (1936, Short) - Mr. Morgan (uncredited)
 Dizzy Doctors (1937, Short) - Dr. Harry Arms (uncredited)
 Back to the Woods (1937, Short) - Governor (uncredited)
 Easy Living (1937) - First Partner (uncredited)
 Murder in Greenwich Village (1937) - Ship's Officer (uncredited)
 Outlaws of the Prairie (1937) - Bearded Townsman (uncredited)
 Paid to Dance (1937) - Dance Hall Floor Manager (uncredited)
 All American Sweetheart (1937) - Waiter (uncredited)
 The Shadow (1937) - Dutch Schultz
 Little Miss Roughneck (1938) - (uncredited)
 Wee Wee Monsieur (1938, Short) - Simitz - Arab Chief (uncredited)
 Who Killed Gail Preston? (1938) - Bill, the Watchman
 Women in Prison (1938) - Guard (uncredited)
 Start Cheering (1938) - Pops - the Soda Jerk (uncredited)
 When G-Men Step In (1938) - Colonel (uncredited)
 Tassels in the Air (1938, Short) - Building Superintendent (uncredited)
 The Lone Wolf in Paris (1938) - Rene Ledaux (uncredited)
 Reformatory (1938) - Cook Howard
 You Can't Take It with You (1938) - Expressman (uncredited)
 Juvenile Court (1938) - Mr. Schultz (uncredited)
 Mutts to You (1938, Short) - Mr. Stutz, Hotel Manager (uncredited)
 Thanks for the Memory (1938) - Refuse Man (uncredited)
 Three Little Sew and Sews (1939, Short) - Party Guest (uncredited)
 The Lone Wolf Spy Hunt (1939) - Fat Man at Party (uncredited)
 A Ducking They Did Go (1939, Short) - Vegetarian in Hallway (uncredited)
 Only Angels Have Wings (1939) - Ship's Captain (uncredited)
 Yes, We Have No Bonanza (1939, Short) - Sheriff (uncredited)
 Saved by the Belle (1939, Short) - Mike (uncredited)
 Stanley and Livingstone (1939) - Newspaperman in Office (uncredited)
 Hitler – Beast of Berlin (1939) - Lustig - Beer Garden Bartender
 Mr. Smith Goes to Washington (1939) - Senate Reporter (uncredited)
 The Lone Wolf Strikes (1940) - Hotel Doorman (uncredited)
 The Doctor Takes a Wife (1940) - Man Outside Phone Booth (uncredited)
 Nutty but Nice (1940, Short) - Dr. Walters (uncredited)
 How High Is Up? (1940, Short) - Mr. Blake (uncredited)
 The Lady in Question (1940) - Gendarme (uncredited)
 From Nurse to Worse (1940, Short) - Dr. D. Lerious (uncredited)
 He Stayed for Breakfast (1940) - Chef (uncredited)
 No Census, No Feeling (1940, Short) - Moe's Bridge Partner (uncredited)
 The Villain Still Pursued Her (1940) - Jim - Policeman (uncredited)
 So Long Mr. Chumps (1941, Short) - Desk Sergeant (uncredited)
 You're the One (1941) - Zeno Springs Hotel Guest
 Meet John Doe (1941) - (uncredited)
 Dutiful But Dumb (1941, Short) - Mr. Wilson (uncredited)
 Adventure in Washington (1941) - Senator on exercise bike (uncredited)
 San Antonio Rose (1941) - Worthington (uncredited)
 I'll Never Heil Again (1941, Short) - Mr. Ixnay (uncredited)
 An Ache in Every Stake (1941, Short) - Poindexter Lawrence (uncredited)
 In the Sweet Pie and Pie (1941, Short) - Senator (uncredited)
 Bedtime Story (1941) - Conventioneer (uncredited)
 Loco Boy Makes Good (1942, Short) - Balbo the Magician (uncredited)
 Sappy Birthday (1942, Short) - Neighbor Policeman, trying to sleep in the daytime
 Cactus Makes Perfect (1942, Short) - Heavyset Prospector (uncredited)
 House of Errors (1942) - White
 My Favorite Blonde (1942) - Ole (uncredited)
 Matri-Phony (1942, Short) - Emperor Octopus Grabus
 Three Smart Saps (1942, Short) - Disappointed customer of tailor (uncredited)
 The Glass Key (1942) - Bartender Serving Beers (uncredited)
 Even as IOU (1942, Short) - Motorist (uncredited)
 They Stooge to Conga (1943, Short) - Hans - the Nazi (uncredited)
 Back from the Front (1943, Short) - Lt. Dungen (uncredited)
 Higher Than a Kite (1943, Short) - Marshall Boring (uncredited)
 Idle Roomers (1943, Short) - Mr. Leander
 Cowboy in the Clouds (1943) - Newspaper Publisher Whitson (uncredited)
 True to Life (1943) - Bit Role (uncredited)
 Chip Off the Old Block (1944) - Sheffer (uncredited)
 Crash Goes the Hash (1944, Short) - Fuller Bull
 Busy Buddies (1944, Short) - Hotcakes Customer (uncredited)
 Her Primitive Man (1944) - Doorman (uncredited)
 Jam Session (1944) - Butler (uncredited)
 Address Unknown (1944) - Nazi Party Member (uncredited)
 Once Upon a Time (1944) - Mayor's Aide (uncredited)
 Secret Command (1944) - Shipyard Worker (uncredited)
 Kansas City Kitty (1944) - Re-po Man from A-1 Piano Co. (uncredited)
 San Diego, I Love You (1944) - Mr. Fitzmaurice (uncredited)
 Mrs. Parkington (1944) - Quartet Member (uncredited)
 No Dough Boys (1944, Short) - Hugo—Nazi Spy
 Let's Go Steady (1945) - Bosby (uncredited)
 She Gets Her Man (1945) - Doorman (uncredited)
 Three Pests in a Mess (1945, Short) - Philip Black
 Sagebrush Heroes (1945) - Editor Haynes (uncredited)
 Sing Me a Song of Texas (1945) - Realtor (uncredited)
 See My Lawyer (1945) - Man in Mud Gang (uncredited)
 Booby Dupes (1945, Short) - Captain
 Having Wonderful Crime (1945) - Guest in Room 202 (uncredited)
 Rockin' in the Rockies (1945) - Stanton (uncredited)
 Idiots Deluxe (1945, Short) - Judge (uncredited)
 I Love a Bandleader (1945) - Counter Man (uncredited)
 Song of the Prairie (1945) - Ted Parker (uncredited)
 Snafu (1945) - American Legionnaire (uncredited)
 Beer Barrel Polecats (1946, Short) - Warden
 The Harvey Girls (1946) - Engineer (uncredited)
 A Bird in the Head (1946, Short) - Prof. Panzer
 Night Editor (1946) - Fat Man in Library (uncredited)
 That Texas Jamboree (1946) - Barbershop Patron (uncredited)
 Renegades (1946) - Caleb Smart (uncredited)
 Dangerous Business (1946) - Fat Man (uncredited)
 Cowboy Blues (1946) - Irate Lodger (uncredited)
 It's Great to Be Young (1946) - Pop (uncredited)
 Three Little Pirates (1946, Short) - Governor
 Lone Star Moonlight (1946) - Sheriff
 Half-Wits Holiday (1947, Short) - Prof. Quackenbush
 The Sea of Grass (1947) - Train Conductor (uncredited)
 Out West (1947, Short) - Doctor (uncredited)
 The Secret Life of Walter Mitty (1947) - Bartender (uncredited)
 Wild Harvest (1947) - Farmer (uncredited)
 Merton of the Movies (1947) - Keystone Kop (uncredited)
 Sing a Song of Six Pants (1947, Short) - Detective Sharp
 It Had to Be You (1947) - Man in Drugstore (uncredited)
 Shivering Sherlocks (1948, Short) - Police Capt. Mullins
 Squareheads of the Round Table (1948, Short) - King Arthur
 Fiddlers Three (1948, Short) - King Cole
 Heavenly Daze (1948, Short) - I. Fleecem
 Mummy's Dummies (1948, Short) - King Rootentooten
 Make Believe Ballroom (1949) - Chef (uncredited)
 A Connecticut Yankee in King Arthur's Court (1949) - Guard (uncredited)
 Hokus Pokus (1949, Short) - Insurance Adjustor
 The Doolins of Oklahoma (1949) - Bank Clerk (uncredited)
 Look for the Silver Lining (1949) - Heckler (uncredited)
 Fuelin' Around (1949, Short) - General
 The Girl from Jones Beach (1949) - Man at Stand (uncredited)
 Malice in the Palace (1949, Short) - Hassan Ben Sober
 Super Wolf (1949, Short) - Police Officer (uncredited)
 And Baby Makes Three (1949) - Umpire (uncredited)
 Punchy Cowpunchers (1950, Short) - Colonel
 The Good Humor Man (1950) - Fat Man in Park (uncredited)
 Kill the Umpire (1950) - Phone Company Manager (uncredited)
 One Shivery Night (1950, Short) - Boss
 Studio Stoops (1950, Short) - Police Captain Casey
 Three Arabian Nuts (1951, Short) - Mr. Bradley
 Scrambled Brains (1951, Short) - Nora's Father
 Bonanza Town (1951) - Whiskers (uncredited)
 Sunny Side of the Street (1951) - King (uncredited)
 The Tooth Will Out (1951, Short) - Dr. Keefer—professor of dentistry
 Pest Man Wins (1951, Short) - Mr. Philander
 A Missed Fortune (1952, Short) - Hotel Manager
 Listen, Judge (1952, Short) - Judge Henderson
 Booty and the Beast (1953, Short) - Night Watchman
 Rip, Sew and Stitch (1953, Short) - Detective Sharp (uncredited, archival footage)
 Income Tax Sappy (1954, Short) - IRS Agent (uncredited)
 Musty Musketeers (1954, Short) - King Cole
 Pals and Gals (1954, Short) - Doctor (uncredited)
 Knutzy Knights (1954, Short) - King Arthur (uncredited)
 Of Cash and Hash (1955, Short) - Police Capt. Mullins (archival footage)
 Bedlam in Paradise (1955, Short) - I. Fleecem
 Flagpole Jitters (1956, Short) - Insurance Adjuster (archival footage)
 Rumpus in the Harem (1956, Short) - Hassan Ben Sober (archival footage)
 Hot Stuff (1956, Short) - Anemian General (uncredited)
 Guns a Poppin (1957, Short) - The Judge (final film role)

References

Bibliography 
 Cassara, Bill (2010). Vernon Dent: Stooge Heavy. Albany: BearManor Media

External links

 
 Vernon Dent at threestooges.net
 

1895 births
1963 deaths
American male film actors
American male silent film actors
Male actors from California
People from San Jose, California
20th-century American male actors
Deaths from diabetes
Burials at Forest Lawn Memorial Park (Hollywood Hills)
American blind people
20th-century American comedians